Nofei Nehemia is an Israeli outpost in the West Bank, in the jurisdiction of the Shomron Regional Council in the northern West Bank. It is officially within the boundaries of Rehelim, a nearby Israeli settlement. First established in 2002, it is situated adjacent to Rechelim on Route 60, between Kfar Tapuach and Eli. The village also lies adjacent to the Palestinian towns of Iskaka and Yasuf. A few dozen families live on the village.

Israeli outposts are illegal under international law and also under Israeli law.

History

The village is named after Nehemia Ben Yehuda, the head of a family who owns a crane company who have been very involved in assisting the establishment of settlements in the West Bank.

The village was established in 2002 as an illegal outpost. In 2003, the Israeli government pledged to dismantle the village.

In January 2021, under Benjamin Netanyahu, the Israeli government decided to legalize the illegal outpost of Nofei Nehemia by reclassifying it as a “neighborhood” of the Rehelim settlement, which itself was an illegal outpost that was legalized a few years prior.

References

Unauthorized Israeli settlements
Populated places established in 2002

Israeli outposts